Jana Vápenková (14 May 1947 – 3 February 2020) was a Czech volleyball player. She competed in the women's tournament at the 1972 Summer Olympics.

References

External links
 

1947 births
2020 deaths
Czech women's volleyball players
Olympic volleyball players of Czechoslovakia
Volleyball players at the 1972 Summer Olympics
People from Děčín
Sportspeople from the Ústí nad Labem Region